The 2013–14 Swedish Figure Skating Championships were held at the Vida Arena in Växjö between December 12 and 15, 2013. Skaters competed in the disciplines of men's singles, ladies' singles, and pair skating on the senior, junior, and novice levels. The results were among the criteria used to choose the teams to the 2014 Winter Olympics, 2014 World Championships, and 2014 European Championships.

Senior results

Men

Ladies

Pairs

External links
 2013–14 Swedish Championships results

Swedish Figure Skating Championships 2013-2014
Swedish Figure Skating Championships 2013-2014
Swedish Figure Skating Championships
Figure Skating Championships 2013-2014
Figure Skating Championships 2013-2014
Sports competitions in Växjö